The men's high jump event at the 1998 Commonwealth Games was held on 19 September in Kuala Lumpur.

Results

References

High
1998